Shilpkar are an artisan community mainly associated with Intaglio techniques and painting. They are largest among Scheduled Caste communities of Uttarakhand.

History 
Shilpkars are not a single caste but a collection of different castes who used to do artistic works from paper, iron, stone, and rope. Shilpkar originated from Uttarakhand are considered Dalit, as they used to make things from rope. Shilpkar in Uttar Pradesh, Maharashtra, and South India, are not considered a Dalit, but have their category mention in SC and OBC, depending upon the State list. In 1925, they were officially recognized as Shilpkar by the British government.

Shilpkars are mainly engaged as Intaglio on stone and gems, Painting, crafting, bronzesmiths, with others engaged in and cultivating, or working as, blacksmiths, weavers, drummers. Bhankora is a native musical instrument and is handmade from copper by Shilpkar artisans of Uttarakhand. They used to perform with it at folk festivals or marriages.

In 1913, Shilpkar Sudharini Sabha, held a convention for the uplifting of Dalits and oppressed people of the area, known as the Shilpkar Mahasabha in Uttarakhand.

Arya Samaj influenced a lot of Shilpkar, especially in the Garhwal region, and many Shilpkars dropped their caste surnames and adopted 'Arya' as a last name. Jayananda Bharati and Baldev Singh Arya were those who promoted "Arya Samaj" in Dalits of Uttarakhand. They started  'Dola Palki Movement' and in 1928 he also organised "Garhwal Sarvadalit Parishad".

He also stood with B. R. Ambedkar during the Round Table Conference in 1932.

Other notable Shilpkar leaders were Khushi Ram and Bachi Ram Arya. Bachi Ram Arya also appealed shilpkars, to break out of mental slavery and exhorted them to recognise the virtues of education, work with the Brahmans on an equal footing and yet be critical of them.

Distribution 
Shilpkars form 52% of the total population of the Scheduled caste population in Uttarakhand and are a beneficiary of the reservation policy.

About 68.5 percent of Shilpkars are cultivators by profession. Shilpkars are mainly found in the hill region of Uttarakhand and Terai regions of Uttar Pradesh. They are also called Tamrakar in Nepal are one of the biggest communities of the country.

Shilpkars have surnames like Arya, Ram, Koli, and lal and have a total of 26 sub-castes in the state.

Notable Shilpkars 

 Yashpal Arya, former speaker of Uttarakhand Legislative Assembly.

See also 

 Chamar

References 

Castes